Michigan Proposal 08-2 was a proposal to amend the Michigan Constitution to remove restrictions on stem cell research in Michigan while maintaining the ban on human cloning. Opponents argued that it would raise taxes. The proposal was passed on November 4, 2008 by voters by a 53 - 47% margin.

Contents
The proposal appeared on the ballot as follows:

Support
In October, former President Bill Clinton came to Michigan to speak in favor of adopting Proposal 2. The Michigan State Medical Society took a neutral position on the ballot measure.

Aftermath
In March 2009, TechTown announced the opening of a stem cell research lab in Detroit. However, the opening was delayed because TechTown had trouble getting funds and State Senator Thomas George attempted to the weaken the amendment with legislation he introduced.

References

External links
 Michigan Stem Cell Initiative (2008) on Ballotpedia
 Letter of opposition from Michigan Catholic Bishops

Stem cell research
2008 in American law
Michigan Proposal 2
Michigan ballot proposals
Proposal 2